IAEDANS is an organic fluorophore (fluorescent molecule). It stands for 5-({2-[(iodoacetyl)amino]ethyl}amino)naphthalene-1-sulfonic acid. It is widely used as a marker in fluorescence spectroscopy.

1,5-IAEDANS has a peak excitation wavelength of 336 nm and a peak emission wavelength of 490 nm. The extinction coefficient of the dye is 5700. It is soluble in dimethylformamide (DMF) or buffer above pH 6 and reacts primarily with thiols.

The absorption spectrum IAEDANS overlaps well with the emission spectrum of tryptophan, making it useful as an acceptor in FRET experiments. It can also be used as a resonance energy donor to fluorophores such as fluorescein, Alexa Fluor 488, Oregon Green, and BODIPY FL.

References

Sulfonic acids
Fluorescent dyes
Organoiodides